The Jewish Community of Chile (CJCH or CHC after its initials in Spanish) is an organization of Jews in Chile. The Jewish Community of Chile is a non-profit organisation. As of 2022 Gerardo Gorodischer is its president.

See also
Comunidad Israelita de Santiago

References

Jews and Judaism in Chile
Jewish organizations